The 1932 Ladies Open Championships was held at the Queen's Club, West Kensington in London from 1–6 February 1932. Susan Noel won her first title defeating Joyce Cave in the final. A record 67 entries were received for the 1932 Open Championship. Three times winners Nancy Cave and Cecily Fenwick were missing because both had retired from competition.

Draw and results

First round

Second round

Main draw

Notes
+ Diana Rhys (née Diana Sloane-Stanley) 
++ Lady Aberdare is Mrs Margaret Bruce

References

Women's British Open Squash Championships
Women's British Open Squash Championships
Women's British Open Squash Championships
Women's British Open Squash Championships
Squash competitions in London
British Open Championships